Daphne Steele (16 October 1929 – 2004) was a Guyanese nurse, who in 1964 became the first Black Matron in the National Health Service.

Early life
Daphne Steele was born in 1929 in the Dutch colony of Essequibo (now part of Guyana) as the eldest of nine children. Her younger sister Carmen Steele later became better known as the actress Carmen Munroe. While her mother stayed at home, her father worked as a pharmacist who travelled around the colony to work. The family were sufficiently well off to be able to afford servants to clean the family house.

Medical career
She underwent training in nursing and midwifery at the public hospital in Georgetown in 1945. She emigrated to the United Kingdom in 1951, as part of the British Government seeking to recruit people to the new National Health Service (NHS). The journey took 14 days, and she arrived in Plymouth, Devon. She was surprised when a white man took her luggage for her, as in her native country, white men only worked in managerial roles. Steele was placed on a fast-track scheme in St James' Hospital in Balham, South London. She found the discipline akin to being in the military, which extended to the nurses' home where she lived. Steele also witnessed the racism of white colleagues and from patients, but tried to be friendly to avoid this personally. She later recalled that her Jamaican colleagues were skilled in "cussing" out particularly nasty patients.

She moved to the United States in 1955, where she worked at a hospital in New Jersey, before moving back in 1960 to the UK, where she was stationed at RAF Brize Norton. She later moved to Manchester, where she was employed as a Deputy Matron at a nursing home. When it was announced that the home was closing, an Irish Matron suggested that Steele should also apply to become a Matron. So in 1964, Steele was appointed as Matron at St. Winifred's Hospital in Ilkley, West Yorkshire. This was the first time that a Black person had been appointed as a Matron anywhere in the NHS. The appointment made news worldwide, with Steele receiving around 350 letters from well-wishers. After the hospital closed in 1971, Steele became a health visitor at Leeds University.

Later life
Following retirement, Steele volunteered for a variety of organisations, including Soroptimist International, and became vice-president of the Association of Guyanese Nurses and Allied Professionals (AGNAP). She was a devoted Methodist. In 2001, the Guyanese High Commissioner to the United Kingdom awarded Steele a certificate in recognition of her medical achievements. Steele died in 2004.

Legacy
In her memory, AGNAP renamed their annual health talk in 2013 to the Daphne Steele Memorial Lecture.

To mark what would have been Steele's 91st birthday on 16 October 2018, a commemorative blue plaque organised by the Nubian Jak Community Trust was unveiled at St. James's Hospital, Balham, where she had trained when she first arrived in England.

References

 1929 births
2004 deaths
People from Essequibo Islands-West Demerara
Guyanese Methodists
Guyanese emigrants to England
Guyanese nurses
Women nurses